Hermann Scheer (29 April 1944 – 14 October 2010) was a Social Democrat member of the German Bundestag (parliament), President of Eurosolar (European Association for Renewable Energy) and General Chairman of the World Council for Renewable Energy. In 1999, Scheer was awarded the Right Livelihood Award for his "indefatigable work for the promotion of solar energy worldwide".

Scheer believed that the continuation of current patterns of energy supply and use would be environmentally, socially, economically, and politically damaging, with renewable energy being the only realistic alternative. Scheer had concluded that it is technically and environmentally feasible to harness enough solar radiation to achieve a total replacement of the foclear (fossil/nuclear) energy system by a global renewable energy economy. The main obstacle to such a change is seen to be political, not technical or economic. In 1999 he was one of the initiators of the German feed-in tariffs that were the major source of the rise of renewable energies in Germany during the following years.

Life
Scheer was born in Wehrheim, and became a member of the Social Democratic Party of Germany in 1965 during his military service as an officer in the Bundeswehr. He majored in economics and law and was active in student politics at the University of Heidelberg. 1979 he graduated  from the Free University of Berlin as a doctor of political science. He worked as postgrade scientist at Universität Stuttgart and as a scientist (1976 till 1980) at Forschungszentrum Karlsruhe (a large nuclear and basic research center). Scheer was member of the German Modern pentathlon national team in his youth. He became a member of the Bundestag in 1980, representing Baden-Württemberg; in 1993, he also became a member of the federal steering committee (Bundesvorstand) of the Social Democratic Party. Scheer had a solid track record as an anti-establishment figure within his own party. He however never gained a direct majority based mandate in any political election and never held any executive post in government.

In the 2008 state election for the Landtag of Hesse, Scheer was originally pegged as minister for development, environment and economics in the shadow cabinet of Andrea Ypsilanti, candidate for Minister-President of Hesse in the election. He announced ambitious energy policy plans, which failed to gain applause with his own party and possible coalition partners. Leading SPD figures as Jürgen Walter and Wolfgang Clement, a former Minister President of North Rhine Westphalia from the right wing of the party, who later left the party, were rather critical. Scheer however believed Ypsilanti's strategies would result in a big triumph of his party at the federal elections 2009. The election result saw the christian-liberal governing parties CDU and FDP lose the majority they had held since 1999 in the traditionally social democratic state. Yet, the result was very difficult because a left majority was not possible without the party The Left (which had been a merger of the ex-communist PDS and left SPD and labour union members, disappointed by the politics of former chancellor Gerhard Schröder). Although Ypsilanti had promised not to work with The Left, a party to which the SPD still had a controversial relationship but also had already worked with many years ago in other states, she refused to govern in a grand coalition under the CDU and did not want to give away the chance to form a new left government. So she successfully negotiated a minority coalition with the Greens, which would be tolerated by The Left. The final list for the proposed government put Scheer as secretary of a downsized ministry of economics still including the task to lead the transition to renewable energies. Ypsilanti's attempt to officially form her government was set to fail when four SPD representatives declined to elect a government with the support of The Left. This led to a disastrous result for the SPD in the following snap election in 2009, in which Scheer did not take part anymore, with CDU and FDP returned to a government majority.

His book Energy Autonomy was instrumental in the making of the film Die 4. Revolution – Energy Autonomy. Scheer advocated for the municipal ownership of utility companies, and was a supporter of the Campaign for the Establishment of a United Nations Parliamentary Assembly, an organisation which campaigns for democratic reformation of the United Nations. 

He suddenly died in a hospital in Berlin from heart failure after an unspecified short and severe illness. His wife (since 1970), Irm Pontenagel, managed the solar lobby association Eurosolar for decades. His daughter Nina Scheer managed an eco management consulting company and is herself a member of the Bundestag. After his sudden death, SPD politician Rita Schwarzelühr-Sutter took his mandate via the German list system.

Books
The Energy Imperative: 100 Percent Renewable Now, 2011, Routledge.
Energy Autonomy, The Economic, Social and Technological Case for Renewable Energy, 2006, Earthscan, 
A Solar Manifesto, 2005, Earthscan, 
The Solar Economy, Renewable Energy for a Sustainable Global Future, 2004, Earthscan,

See also
 Anti-nuclear movement in Germany
 Die 4. Revolution – Energy Autonomy
 Eurosolar
 Hans-Josef Fell
 International Renewable Energy Agency (IRENA)
 Michael Sladek
 Renewable energy commercialization
 Rolf Disch
 World Future Council

References

External links 

 
Hermann Scheer in One of His Final Interviews - video by Democracy Now!

1944 births
2010 deaths
Members of the Bundestag for Baden-Württemberg
Non-fiction environmental writers
People associated with renewable energy
People associated with solar power
People from Hesse-Nassau
Recipients of the Cross of the Order of Merit of the Federal Republic of Germany
Renewable energy economy
Members of the Bundestag 2009–2013
Members of the Bundestag 2005–2009
Members of the Bundestag 2002–2005
Members of the Bundestag 1998–2002
Members of the Bundestag 1994–1998
Members of the Bundestag for the Social Democratic Party of Germany